Scipio is an unincorporated community in Pittsburg County, Oklahoma, United States. There is no data available on its current population, and Google Maps did not bother to visit the community.

Demographics

History
The community was named for nearby Scipio Creek, which was in turn named for the Roman general Scipio Africanus.  
At the time of its founding, Scipio was located in Tobucksy County, Choctaw Nation.  A post office opened at Scipio, Indian Territory on January 24, 1890.

References

Unincorporated communities in Pittsburg County, Oklahoma
Unincorporated communities in Oklahoma